Einstein Bros. Bagels is an American chain that specializes in bagels and coffee. In 1996, Berkeley-based Noah's Bagels was bought out by Einstein Bros. Manhattan-based New World Coffee, which bought out Manhattan Bagel in 1998, bought out Einstein Bros. in 2000 post-bankruptcy.

In the 1990s, Einstein Bros. had bought out retail bagel chains from regions around the US without bagel traditions: Offerdahl's Bagel Gourmet, Bagel & Bagel, Baltimore Bagel, and Brackman Brothers.

History
Einstein Bros. was created by the chain restaurant corporation Boston Chicken (now Boston Market) in 1995, as a way to market breakfast foods. The chain is now owned by Einstein and Noah Corp., a wholly owned subsidiary of Einstein Noah Restaurant Group, Inc.

Boston Chicken, Inc. originally formed the Einstein and Noah Bagel Corporation as Progressive Bagel Concepts, Incorporated (PBCI) in March 1995, when it purchased four retail bagel chains, all located in regions of the United States that did not have longstanding bagel traditions. These companies included Offerdahl's Bagel Gourmet, Incorporated (Fort Lauderdale), Bagel & Bagel, Incorporated (Kansas City), Baltimore Bagel (San Diego), and Brackman Brothers, Incorporated (Salt Lake City). Each found that their stores were similar in that they offered both original and new bagel flavors in wealthy neighborhoods where the customers had relatively little previous exposure to bagels.

Noah's Bagels was founded in 1989 by Noah Alper on College Avenue in Berkeley, California. In 1996, the chain of 38 stores was sold to Einstein Bros. for $100 million.

New World Coffee was founded in the early 1990s by Ramin Kamfar, an investment banker who left his finance career to open a coffee shop.  It bought Manhattan Bagel out of bankruptcy in 1998. The combined company purchased Chesapeake Bagel Bakery in 1999 when that chain had 89 stores, giving Manhattan approximately 350 locations.

In 2000, Einstein Bros. filed for bankruptcy, having loaned too much money to franchisees. After it declared bankruptcy, New World Coffee, which had earlier attempted an unsuccessful hostile takeover, bought the company out of bankruptcy for $190 million.

In 2014, Einstein Noah Restaurant Group was acquired by JAB Holding Company and BDT Capital Partners.

On August 5, 2021, Einstein Bros. announced that it had merged with Panera Bread and Caribou Coffee to form Panera Brands.

See also
 List of bakery cafés

References

External links

 Official website

Restaurants in Colorado
Bagel companies
Bakery cafés
Fast-food chains of the United States
Companies based in Lakewood, Colorado
Companies formerly listed on the Nasdaq
Restaurants established in 1995
1995 establishments in Colorado
Companies that filed for Chapter 11 bankruptcy in 2000
2014 mergers and acquisitions
American companies established in 1995